2. liga, currently named DOXXbet liga due to sponsorship reasons, is the second-highest division in the Slovak football league system after the Fortuna Liga. The 2016–17 season of the DOXXbet liga will be the 24th season of the second-tier football league in Slovakia, since its establishment in 1993.

For the third time in history (and for now for the last time), teams will compete in two groups, with top six sides from each of groups will advance to the championship round and all other teams will play in relegation groups. From the 2017–18 season, 2. Liga will feature 16 teams playing in nationwide group.

Changes from last season 
In Eastern group will play only 10 teams.

Team changes 
1. FC Tatran Prešov were promoted to the Slovak First Football League after the 2015–16 season.
MFK Skalica was relegated from the Slovak First Football League after the 2015–16 season.
ŠK Svätý Jur, FC ŠTK 1914 Šamorín, MŠK Fomat Martin, ŠK Odeva Lipany were promoted from the Slovak Third Football League after the 2015–16 season.
MFK Dolný Kubín, FK Iskra Borčice, OFK Dunajská Lužná, FK Slovan Duslo Šaľa, ŠK Senec and OFK Teplička nad Váhom were relegated (or withdrew) during or after the 2015–16 season.

Group West

Stadium and locations

Personnel and kits

League table

Group East

Stadium and locations

Personnel and kits

League table

Championship round 
Teams will carry over all points and goals from regular season, but records against the two last-placed teams in Group West will be excluded.

League table

Relegation round

Group West

League table

Group East

League table

Relegation play-offs 
Winner of the relegation play-offs remained in 2. Liga, the other relegated to 3. Liga.

First leg

Second leg

Season statistics

Top goalscorers
Updated through matches played on 14 May 2017.

Hat-tricks

Note
4 Player scored 4 goals
5 Player scored 5 goals

See also
2016–17 Slovak First Football League
2016–17 3. Liga (Slovakia)

Stats 
 List of transfers summer 2016
 List of transfers winter 2016-17

References

2016-17
2016–17 in European second tier association football leagues
2